County Roscommon is a county in Ireland. It is part of the province of Connacht and the Northern and Western Region. It is the 11th largest Irish county by area and 27th most populous. Its county town and largest town is Roscommon. Roscommon County Council is the local authority for the county. The population of the county was 69,995 as of the 2022 census.

Etymology
County Roscommon is named after the county town of Roscommon. Roscommon comes from the Irish Ros meaning a wooded, gentle height and Comán, the first abbot and bishop of Roscommon who founded the first monastery there in 550 AD.

Geography

Lough Key in north Roscommon is noted for having thirty-two islands. The geographical centre of Ireland is located on the western shore of Lough Ree in the south of the county.

Roscommon is the third largest of Connacht's five counties by size and the second-smallest in terms of population. It ranks 11th in size of Ireland's 32 counties, but 27th in terms of population, making it the 3rd most sparsely populated county after Leitrim and Mayo. The county borders every other Connacht county: Galway, Mayo, Sligo, and Leitrim, as well as three Leinster counties: Longford, Westmeath, and Offaly. In 2008, a news report said that statistically, people from Roscommon have the longest life expectancy of any county on the island of Ireland.

Seltannasaggart, which is located along the northern border with County Leitrim, is the tallest point in County Roscommon, measuring to a height of 428 m (1,404 ft).

Largest towns by population
According to the 2016 census:
Roscommon 5,876
Boyle 2,568
Castlerea 1,992
Ballaghaderreen 1,808

Baronies
There are nine historical baronies in County Roscommon.

North Roscommon
Boyle (north Roscommon including Boyle and Arigna).
Frenchpark (north-west, including Ballaghaderreen and Frenchpark).
Roscommon (mid-north-east, including Strokestown and Tulsk).
Castlereagh (west, including Castlerea and Ballinlough).
Ballintober North (east including Rooskey and Tarmonbarry).

South Roscommon
Ballymoe shared with County Galway includes Ballymoe, Creggs and Glenamaddy.
Ballintober South (south-mid-east, including Roscommon).
Athlone (mid-south, including Knockcroghery and part of Athlone).
Moycarn (far-south, including part of Ballinasloe).

History

Rathcroghan, near Tulsk, a complex of archaeological sites, the home of Queen Medb (anglicised Maeve), was the seat of Kings of Connacht and then to the High Kings of Ireland.  This was the starting point of the Táin Bó Cúailnge, or Cattle Raid of Cooley, an epic tale in Irish mythology. The county is home to prehistoric ringforts such as Carnagh West Ringfort and Drummin fort.

County Roscommon as an administrative division has its roots in the Middle Ages. With the conquest and division of the Kingdom of Connacht, those districts in the east retained by King John as "The King's Cantreds" covered County Roscommon, and parts of East Galway. These districts were leased to the native kings of Connacht and eventually became the county. In 1585 during the Tudor re-establishment of counties under the Composition of Connacht, Roscommon was established with the South-west boundary now alongside the River Suck.

Medieval art
A "well defined" and "original" fine metal workshop was active in County Roscommon in the 12th century. The Cross of Cong, the Aghadoe crosier, Shrine of the Book of Dimma and Shrine of Manchan of Mohill' are grouped together as having been created by Mael Isu Bratain Ui Echach et al., at the same Roscommon workshop. The workshop has been linked to St. Assicus of Elphin.

Ordnance Survey

John O'Donovan (1806–1861), historian and scholar, visited County Roscommon in 1837, while compiling information for the Ordnance Survey. Entering St Peter's parish in Athlone in June 1837, he wrote, "I have now entered upon a region totally different from Longford, and am very much pleased with the intelligence of the people." However, he had major problems with place-names. He later wrote, "I am sick to death's door of lochawns, and it pains me to the very soul to have to make these remarks, but what can I do when I cannot make the usual progress? Here I am stuck in the mud in the middle of Loughs, Turlaghs, Lahaghs and Curraghs, the names of many of which are only known to a few old men in their immediate neighbourhood and I cannot give many of them utterance from the manner in which they are spelled."

Places of interest 

Arigna Mining Experience
Boyle Abbey
Clonalis House
Elphin Windmill
Lough Key Forest Park
McDermott's Castle
Meehambee Dolmen
National Famine Museum
Rathcroghan
Roscommon County Museum
Strokestown Park

Government and politics

Roscommon is governed locally by the 18-member Roscommon County Council, a body created under the Local Government (Ireland) Act 1898.

The 1898 Act also divided the county into the rural districts of Athlone No. 2, Ballinasloe No. 2, Boyle No. 1, Carrick-on-Shannon No. 2, Castlerea, Roscommon, and Strokestown. The rural districts were abolished in 1925. Boyle and Roscommon were administered locally by town commissioners. Roscommon town commissioners were abolished in 1927. After becoming a town council in 2002, in common with all other town councils in Ireland, Boyle Town Council was abolished under the Local Government Reform Act 2014.

For general elections, Roscommon is mostly within the three-seat Dáil constituency of Roscommon–Galway, with a portion of the county in the Sligo–Leitrim constituency. For European elections, the county is part of the Midlands–North-West constituency.

Rail transport
There are railway stations located in Boyle (Dublin–Sligo line), Carrick-on-Shannon (Dublin–Sligo line), Roscommon (Dublin–Westport line), Castlerea (Dublin-Westport line), Ballinasloe (Dublin-Galway line) and Athlone (Dublin–Galway and Dublin–Westport lines).

Sport
Gaelic football is the dominant sport in Roscommon. Roscommon won the All-Ireland Senior Football Championships in 1943 and 1944 and the National Football League Division 1 in 1979, as well as Division 2 in 2015 and 2018. Roscommon have captured the Connacht Senior Football Championship on 23 occasions, the most recent being in 2019.

Roscommon's main hurling title was the 2007 Nicky Rackard Cup.

Soccer and Rugby are also popular sports in the county.

People
In order of birth:
Charles O'Conor (1710–1791), historian and antiquarian of the O'Conor Don family
Matthew O'Conor Don (1773–1844) historian born in Ballinagare
Arthur French, 1st Baron de Freyne (1786–1856), Member of Parliament and landlord of Frenchpark House
Sir John Scott Lillie (1790–1868) CB, decorated Peninsular War veteran, inventor and political activist in England
James Curley (1796–1889), Jesuit and astronomer, born in Athleague
William Wilde (1815–1876), surgeon, innovator and father of Oscar Wilde, born in Castlerea
Michael Dockry (born 1817), member of the Wisconsin State Assembly
Thomas Curley (1825–1904), American Civil War colonel, farmer and Wisconsin legislator, born in Tremane, near Athleague
John Gately Downey (24 June 1827 – 1 March 1894), seventh governor of California from 14 January 1860 to 10 January 1862
Henry Gore-Browne (1830–1912), Victoria Cross recipient, born in Newtown
Luke O'Connor (1831–1915), first soldier to receive the Victoria Cross, born in Hillstreet, near Elphin
John Fitzgibbon (1845–1919), Member of Parliament
William Griffiths (1841–1879), recipient of the Victoria Cross, born in Co. Roscommon
Percy French (1854–1920), born in Tulsk, was a foremost songwriter and entertainer, and water-colour painter
Sir Owen Lloyd (1854–1941), recipient of the Victoria Cross, born in Co. Roscommon
Thomas Heazle Parke (1857–1893, explorer and naturalist, born at Clogher House, Kilmore
Charlotte O'Conor Eccles (1860–1911) writer, journalist and translator born in the county
Roderic O'Conor (1860–1940), impressionist artist of the O'Conor Don Family
Douglas Hyde (1860–1949), scholar of the Irish language, first President of Ireland (1938–45), founder of the Gaelic League during the Revival of the late 19th – early 20th century, born in Castlerea and buried in the Hyde Museum, Frenchpark
Margaret Cousins (née Gillespie, 1878–1954), educationist and suffragist in India, born in Boyle
Maureen O'Sullivan (1911–1998), Ireland's first international movie star, born in Boyle
Máire McDonnell-Garvey (1927–2009), Traditional Irish musician born in Tobracken near Ballaghaderreen
Brian O'Doherty (born 1928), artist and art critic in New York City, born in Ballaghaderreen
Albert Reynolds (1932–2014), Taoiseach, born in Rooskey
Nuala Quinn-Barton (born 1952), US film producer, artist and model brought up at Killerr, Ballintober
Brian Leyden (born 1960), novelist, short story writer, screenwriter and documentarian of Arigna
Luke 'Ming' Flanagan (born 1972), politician and MEP born in Roscommon
Chris O'Dowd (born 1979), actor and comedian, born in Boyle
Seamus O'Neill (born 1982 or 1983), Gaelic footballer

See also
 Counties of Ireland
 Earl of Roscommon
 High Sheriff of Roscommon
 List of abbeys and priories in Ireland (County Roscommon)
 Lord Lieutenant of Roscommon

References

Secondary references

External links

 Official site – County Council
 Rathcroghan, Celtic Royal site of Connacht

 
Roscommon
Roscommon
Roscommon